The Raja of Tanjore is a title pertaining to two distinct South Indian dynasties:

 Thanjavur Nayak kingdom (1532–1673)
 Thanjavur Maratha kingdom (1674–1855)